Bwilingu is an administrative ward and capital of Chalinze District in Pwani Region of Tanzania. 
According to the 2012 census, the ward has a total population of 35,149.

References

Pwani Region